Deja Que Te Cante (Let Me Sing You) is the seventeenth studio album by Colombian musician singer-songwriter Joe Arroyo. It was released by Sony Music Colombia on November 26, 1997. The most successful songs were "Ella y Tú" and "Mosaico Lo de la Chula".

Track listing

References 

Joe Arroyo albums
Sony Music Colombia albums
1997 albums